The following highways are numbered 998:

United States 
  Louisiana Highway 998
  MD 998, Maryland
  Pennsylvania Route 998 (former)
  Puerto Rico Highway 998 (former)